Roslyn is a suburb in the city of Palmerston North, Manawatū-Whanganui, New Zealand.

Roslyn is also located 2.1 km SE from Palmerston North International Airport.

The suburb is predominantly residential and at the 2018 Census it had a population of 2,364.

History

Richter, Nannestad & Co., a sawmilling company, acquired and cleared the vast deep forested area northeast of Palmerston North. In 1879, the company owned 600 acres of land in the area between Vogel Street, North St, Boundary Rd (now Tremaine Ave) and Featherston Street.

In 1900, Robert Price Edwards established a brick-making business at the site of the current Edwards Pit Park, He constructed the Hoffman Kiln at the site in 1904, which could fire 9,000 brings in a single chamber using clay that was dug from the site. The kiln building is now a protected heritage building.

In 1902, Charles Mackintosh Ross, founder of Rosco (CM Ross and Co) purchased land in the east end of Featherston Street and built a house in 1908, Rangimarie (still extant). In 1924, Ross died, the property passing to his wife (who lived at the house until her death thirty years later). In 1940, Mrs Ross sold land around Rangimarie to the Government, which became the basis of a new state house subdivision. The Government later purchased more land nearby.

The area was known as Ross Block until 1948, when it was renamed Roslyn. Unfortunately, when the Post Office was established here, there was already a Roslyn in Dunedin. Therefore, the Terrace End-Roslyn Progressive Association had to find another name for the area.
Rossmont was chosen because of the location; the fact the area is higher up from the rest of Palmerston North. Recently, perhaps because of the local primary school, the name Roslyn has resurfaced.

The area now Roslyn has been known under many names including Ross Block, Ross, Rossmont and Terrace End. Until recently Statistics New Zealand identified those who live in Roslyn as it is now, lived in Terrace End. Terrace End as it is now, was known as Brightwater.

Demographics

There were 870 households. There were 1,182 males and 1,185 females, giving a sex ratio of 1.0 males per female. The median age was 31.6 years (compared with 37.4 years nationally), with 501 people (21.2%) aged under 15 years, 621 (26.3%) aged 15 to 29, 936 (39.6%) aged 30 to 64, and 303 (12.8%) aged 65 or older.

Ethnicities were 66.9% European/Pākehā, 23.5% Māori, 7.9% Pacific peoples, 15.6% Asian, and 3.2% other ethnicities (totals add to more than 100% since people could identify with multiple ethnicities).

The proportion of people born overseas was 21.6%, compared with 27.1% nationally.

Although some people objected to giving their religion, 45.1% had no religion, 37.2% were Christian, 3.7% were Hindu, 1.6% were Muslim, 1.0% were Buddhist and 3.8% had other religions.

Of those at least 15 years old, 345 (18.5%) people had a bachelor or higher degree, and 390 (20.9%) people had no formal qualifications. The median income was $27,700, compared with $31,800 nationally. The employment status of those at least 15 was that 918 (49.3%) people were employed full-time, 255 (13.7%) were part-time, and 108 (5.8%) were unemployed.

Features

Roslyn has a community policing centre and fire station, a community pool, a local pub, and numerous shops. There is a large agricultural zone which manufactures concrete and plastic pipes, agricultural feed, distributing hubs, car parts are present also.

Terrace End Cemetery, the oldest cemetery in Palmerston North, is located at the foot of Vogel Street. Almost 10,000 people have been buried in the cemetery since Rangitāne gifted the land to the fledgling Palmerston No rth settlement in 1875. Plots are now closed, but the descendants of those buried at the cemetery can be buried with their relatives.

Skogland Park, a football park, is named after former MP Phil Skoglund.

Vautier Park, a former Edwards Brick and Pipes quarry site and Palmerston North's main outdoor netball park, is named for Catherine Vautier, a former teacher at QEC who was instrumental in the formation of Manawatu Netball.

Edwards Pit Park, a former Brick and Pipes site and former soccer ground, has been redeveloped with native trees, waterways and paths.

Norton Park, which features a wetland and the remnants of Little Kawau Stream.

Hulme Street Reserve is also located in Roslyn.

Many Roslyn street names are named after well-known writers or Victoria Cross recipients.

Government

Roslyn was formerly a part of the Papaioea Ward of the Palmerston North City Council, alongside neighbouring Milson, Papaioea, Palmerston North Hospital Area and Kelvin Grove.

Prior to 1996, Roslyn north and east of Featherston Street was part of the Manawatu electorate, while Roslyn south of Featherston Street was in Palmerston North electorate. The entire suburb is now part of the Palmerston North electorate and  Māori electorate of Te Tai Hauāuru.

Education

It includes the Whakatipuria Teen Parent Unit.

Notable people

 Former MP Steve Maharey (Labour) spent some of his early life in Roslyn
 Hugo Inglis Black Sticks hockey player grew up in Roslyn
 Polly Inglis, Otago Sparks cricketer, grew up in Roslyn

References

Suburbs of Palmerston North
Populated places in Manawatū-Whanganui